St Albans City Hospital is an acute District General Hospital in St Albans, Hertfordshire operated by the West Hertfordshire Hospitals NHS Trust.

History
The hospital was established by St Albans Board of Guardians as a workhouse in 1838. It became known as the St Albans Public Assistance Institution in 1930, Osterhills Hospital in 1948 and the St Albans City Hospital in the 1950s. Two wards at the hospital closed in February 2017.

Facilities
An Integrated Urgent Care Hub runs on site and treats urgent but not life-threatening health conditions. It offers appointments between 9am and 6pm, seven days a week and provides access to diagnostic services such as x-rays. Patients are booked into the service, often with same day appointments, through NHS 111 or their GP practice. It is not a walk-in service.

References

External links 
 
 St Albans City Hospital on the NHS website
 Inspection reports from the Care Quality Commission

Hospitals in Hertfordshire
Hospital buildings completed in 1838
NHS hospitals in England